New Zealand contains approximately 2900 glaciers over  in size, almost all of them along the Southern Alps, the main divide of the South Island. This is down from around 3100 glaciers recorded in the late 1970s, due to ongoing changes to the earth's climate. Eight of New Zealand's glaciers are found on Mount Ruapehu, and represent the only glaciers within mainland New Zealand outside of the South Island.

The below is a list of named glaciers in mainland New Zealand as recorded by the New Zealand Geographic Board, who are responsible for the naming of geographic places and features in New Zealand. It does not include the several glaciers located within the Ross Dependency, a region of Antarctica claimed by New Zealand.

North Island

South Island

See also
 List of glaciers
 Glaciers of New Zealand

References